Trasilla (or Tarsila) and Emiliana (sometimes Aemiliana ) were aunts of Gregory the Great and are venerated as virgin saints of the sixth century.  They appear in the Roman Martyrology, Trasilla on 24 December, Emiliana on 5 January.

History
Trasilla and Emiliana were sisters who came from an ancient Roman noble family, the gens Anicia. Their brother, Senator Gordian, was a very rich patrician with a magnificent villa on the Caelian Hill and large estates in Sicily.

Gregory (Hom. XXXVIII, 15, on the Gospel of St. Matthew, and Lib. Dial., IV, 16) relates that his father, the Roman senator Gordian, had three sisters: Trasilla, Emiliana, and Gordiana.  All three had devoted themselves to a religious life and led a life of virginity, fasting, and prayer. They practiced their faith in their father's house, located on the Clivus Scauri in Rome. Gordiana, at first as devout as her sisters, later abandoned this calling and is thus not venerated as a saint.

Tradition states that Felix III, an ancestor, appeared to Trasilla and bade her to enter Heaven, and on the eve of Christmas Trasilla died, seeing Jesus Christ beckoning. The legend also states that Trasilla a few days later appeared to Emiliana, inviting her to celebrate Epiphany in heaven.

Tradition says that their relics and those of their sister-in-law, Silvia, are in the Oratory of St. Andrew on the Celian Hill.

Notes

References 

Sibling duos
People of medieval Rome
6th-century Italo-Roman people
6th-century Christian saints
Italian Roman Catholic saints
6th-century Italian women
Medieval Italian saints
Female saints of medieval Italy